Varezh is a rural locality (a village) in Borisoglebskoye Rural Settlement, Muromsky District, Vladimir Oblast, Russia. The population was 25 as of 2010. There are 5 streets.

Geography 
Varezh is located 23 km north of Murom (the district's administrative centre) by road. Molotitsy is the nearest rural locality.

References 

Rural localities in Muromsky District